Bill Sewell may refer to:

 Bill Sewell (American football) (1916–1989), American football player
 Bill Sewell (politician) (1901–1980), Australian politician

See also
 William Sewell (disambiguation)